Albota de Sus is a commune in Taraclia District, Moldova. It is composed of three villages: Albota de Sus, Roșița and Sofievca.

References

Communes of Taraclia District